Karen Kilimnik (born 1955) is an American painter and installation artist.

Life and work
Karen traveled through much of the United States and Canada as a young child. She often spoke of Russell, Manitoba as being an inspiration for her later works. Karen Kilimnik studied at Temple University, Philadelphia.

Her installations reflected a young viewpoint of pop culture. An example of this work is her 1989 breakout The Hellfire Club Episode of the Avengers, which is composed of photocopied images, clothing, drawings, and other objects that reverentially embody the glamour, risk, and mod kitsch of the 1960s television show. The work exemplified the “scatter” style of her installations.

Kilimnik's paintings, characterised by loose brushwork, bold colors and "thrift shop paint-by-numbers awkwardness", are pastiches of the Old Masters and often incorporate portraits of celebrities. In contrast to the celebrity portraits of Elizabeth Peyton, Kilimnik, "blends together Conceptual and performance art and 1980's appropriation with the current interest in female psychology and identity."

Jonathan Jones described her portrait of Hugh Grant (1997) as "a nice example of a relatively new genre of painting, which we might call the iconic portrait, not commissioned by its sitter but based on photographs, magazine cuttings, film clips."

Her work is variously described as "sharp and witty...an interesting exercise in conceptual control" and as "wan and whimsical..."

Collections
Kilimnik's has work in the collection of the Museum of Modern Art, the Carnegie Museum of Art and the Whitney Museum of American Art.

Exhibitions
 The Legacy, White Cube, London (October to December 1994)
 Karen Kilimnik: Solo Exhibition, South London Gallery, London (July 2000)
 Basel Historical Museum, Basel, May to July 2005
 Fondazione Bevilacqua La Masa, (June to October 2005) 
 Karen Kilimnik: Fairy Battle Irish Museum of Modern Art, Dublin (February 2003)
 Karen Kilimnik, The Serpentine Gallery, London (February to April 2007)
 Karen Kilimnik, The Institute of Contemporary Art, Philadelphia, Philadelphia (April to August 2007), curated by Ingrid Schaffner This exhibition, the first significant survey of Kilimnik’s paintings and installation-based work since the late 1980s, traveled to the Museum of Contemporary Art, Chicago in 2008.
 The Powel House/Landmarks Contemporary Projects, Philadelphia (2007), curated by Robert Wuilfe
Dance Rehearsal: Karen Kilimnik's World of Ballet and Theatre, the Museum of Contemporary Art Denver, Denver, Colorado, curated by Nora Burnett-Abrams, 2013

Bibliography
Karen Kilimnik (ed. Lionel Bovier), Zurich: JRP/Ringier (2006).

References

1955 births
Date of birth missing (living people)
Place of birth missing (living people)
Living people
American women painters
American women installation artists
American installation artists
Artists from Philadelphia
Temple University alumni
21st-century American women artists
American contemporary painters